Stanton is an unincorporated community in Jefferson County, in the U.S. state of Pennsylvania.

History
Stanton was originally called Belleview, and under the latter name was laid out in 1844. Stanton was the name of the post office at Belleview. A post office was established under the name Stanton in 1862, and remained in operation until 1911.

References

Unincorporated communities in Jefferson County, Pennsylvania
Unincorporated communities in Pennsylvania